The Glass Mountains  (also known as Gloss Mountains or Gloss Hills) are not actually mountains, but a series of mesas and buttes that are part of the Blaine Escarpment that extends from the Permian red beds of northwestern Oklahoma in Major County. The Glass Mountains stretch west along U.S. Route 412 from Orienta south of the Cimarron River. The name comes from the sparkling selenite crystals on the slopes and tops of the mesas.

Geology

The next layer was formed during the Permian Period, which occurred 230 to 270 million years ago. The Permian "redbeds" are subdivided into the Cimarronian Series (2850 feet) at the base, overlain by the Custerian Series (400 feet, top eroded). Deposits of Flowerpot shale ( to ) that consists mainly of red-brown illitic-chloritic shale, are found at this area.

History
The first American explorers referred to this feature as the "Shining Mountains," when they saw the formation in 1821. The name Glass Mountains has been attributed to an explorer named Thomas James. James visited this area during 1821, while on a trading expedition along the Cimarron River. In 1875, a transcription error by a mapmaker resulted in the name Gloss Mountains which is still a somewhat common name for the mountains.

The region became part of the Cherokee Outlet during the 19th Century. In 1891, botanist George Walter Stevens, started collecting specimens in the Glass Mountains domain for his dissertation. The University of Oklahoma Bebb Herbarium holds 4,500 samples that Stevens collected statewide. Two cacti he may have collected in the Glass Mountains area are Echinocereus caespitosus and Opuntia phaecantha.

State park
The park allows climbers to hike to the top of the mesa via a path and stairs. Picnic tables and an informational kiosk have been installed, and a pond known as Rattlesnake Lake is nearby.

Notes

References

External links
 Encyclopedia of Oklahoma History and Culture - Glass Mountains
 Oklahoma Digital Maps: Digital Collections of Oklahoma and Indian Territory

See also
 Gloss Mountain State Park

Mountain ranges of Oklahoma
Hills of Oklahoma
Landforms of Major County, Oklahoma
Buttes of the United States
Mesas of Oklahoma
Protected areas of Major County, Oklahoma